Francisco Costa (born June 28, 1973) is a former professional tennis player from Brazil.

He is the current captain of the Brazil Davis Cup team.

ATP Challenger and ITF Futures finals

Singles: 14 (9–5)

Doubles: 9 (3–6)

Performance timeline

Singles

External links 
 
 
 

1973 births
Living people
Brazilian male tennis players
Sportspeople from Porto Alegre
21st-century Brazilian people
20th-century Brazilian people